Aeolus is the name of various figures in Greek mythology.

Aeolus or Aiolos may also refer to:

Places

North America
 Mount Aeolus (Alberta), Canada
 Mount Aeolus (Vermont), US
 Aeolus Cave, Vermont, US

Antarctica
 Mount Aeolus (Antarctica), Victoria Land
 Aeolus Ridge, Alexander Island

Land transportation
 Aeolus (motorcycle 1903–1905), a 492cc single-cylinder bike made by Bown in England
 Aeolus (motorcycle 1914–1916), a 147cc two-stroke bike made by Bown in England
 Aeolus Railroad Car, an early 19th-century wind-propelled experiment
 Aeolus (marque), a Chinese automotive brand name, originally called the Fengshen

Ships
 , several ships of the British Royal Navy
 , several ships of the US Navy
 Aeolus (1850), a wooden ketch built in Australia
 , a steamship built in Scotland and eventually sold to Liberia and renamed Aiolos in 1959
 Aiolos (P19), a Greek Navy fast patrol boat based on the Royal Navy Brave-class patrol boat

Arts and entertainment
 "Aeolus" (Ulysses episode) an episode in James Joyce's novel Ulysses
 Sagittarius Aiolos, a character in the Japanese manga Saint Seiya
 Aeolus, a boss character from the 2007 game Mega Man ZX Advent
 Aeolus, a ghost ship in the 2009 film Triangle
 Aeolus, a ghost ship in the 2018 film The Boat

Other uses
 ADM-Aeolus, a European earth observation satellite launched in 2018
 Aeolus (beetle), a genus of click beetles
 Aiolos Astakou B.C., a Greek professional basketball club based in Astakos
 Aiolos Trikalon, a Greek former professional basketball club that was based in Trikala
 IKZF3, a protein in humans also called zinc finger protein Aiolos